Kung Mamahalin Mo Lang Ako (International title: If Only You Love Me) is a Philippine television drama romance series broadcast by GMA Network. Directed by Ruel S. Bayani, it stars Marian Rivera, Ehra Madrigal, and Camille Prats. It premiered on August 15, 2005 on the network's Dramarama sa Hapon line up replacing Saang Sulok ng Langit. The series concluded on February 17, 2006 with a total of 135 episodes. It was replaced by Agawin Mo Man ang Lahat in its timeslot.

Cast and characters

Lead cast
 Marian Rivera as Clarisse Pelaez
 Ehra Madrigal as Vanessa
 Camille Prats as Joyce

Supporting cast
 Oyo Boy Sotto as Segismundo "Sig" Lariza
 Keempee de Leon as Alfonse Lariza
 AJ Eigenmann as Gilbert
 Bing Loyzaga as Mayor Amanda Lariza
 Joseph Izon as Jerome
 Chinggay Riego as Mrs. Oliver
 Hermes Gacutan as Rudolph
 John Apacible
 Lara Melissa de Leon as Eleanor
 Anne Villegas as Emilia
 Gina Alajar
 Tommy Abuel as Enrique
 Symon Soler
 Sheila Marie Rodriguez
 Gio Alvarez
 Bobby Andrews

References

External links
 

2005 Philippine television series debuts
2006 Philippine television series endings
Filipino-language television shows
GMA Network drama series
Philippine romance television series
Television series by TAPE Inc.
Television shows set in the Philippines